Vladimirs Žavoronkovs (born 25 November 1976) is a former Latvian football defender, currently the assistant manager of Daugava Daugavpils in the Latvian Higher League.

References

External links

1976 births
Living people
Sportspeople from Daugavpils
Latvian footballers
Skonto FC players
FK Ventspils players
Dinaburg FC players
Latvia international footballers
FK Rīga players
Latvian expatriate footballers
FC Daugava players
Association football defenders
Ilūkstes NSS players